Luigi Turci (born 27 January 1970) is an Italian former professional footballer who played as a goalkeeper. He retired after the 2006–07 season. His last club was Cesena in Serie B. He is currently active as goalkeeping coach of A.C. Milan.

Football career
He started his career at native club Cremonese. After loaned to Treviso and Alessandria (Serie C1), he became Cremonese no.1 goalkeeper, and helped the team gain promotion to Serie A in 1993.

After Cremonese were relegated to Serie B in 1996, he joined Udinese of Serie A, still remaining the first choice goalkeeper of the team.

He moved again in 2002, this time to U.C. Sampdoria. He made 33 appearances during the 2002–03 Serie A season. However, following the arrival of Francesco Antonioli from A.S. Roma in 2003, Turci was forced to become the second choice goalkeeper, and made just five appearances in the next two seasons.

In 2005, he joined Cesena in Serie B for whom he played 62 league games before hanging up his boots in 2007.

Throughout his career, Turci played a total of 271 Serie A games between 1993 and 2004.

Style of play
During his career, Turci stood out for his penalty–stopping abilities; he saved 12 spot kicks in 271 appearances over the course of his eleven seasons in the Italian top–flight, the joint–ninth–most penalties saved in Serie A history, alongside Emiliano Viviano, Massimo Taibi, and Giuseppe Taglialatela.

Honours
Udinese
UEFA Intertoto Cup: 2000

References

External links
 CesenaCalcio.it

1970 births
Living people
Sportspeople from Cremona
Association football goalkeepers
Italian footballers
Treviso F.B.C. 1993 players
U.S. Alessandria Calcio 1912 players
U.S. Cremonese players
Udinese Calcio players
U.C. Sampdoria players
A.C. Cesena players
Serie A players
Serie B players
Footballers from Lombardy
A.C. Milan non-playing staff